Joe Mullaney (born 1962, Glasgow, Scotland) is a Scottish actor, best known for his role as Ronnie Witherspoon in Restless Natives (1985).

In 1980, while still attending John Bosco Secondary School, Joe became one of the presenters on 'Asking Around', a youth programme examining the questions, answers, pressures, problems and challenges that young Scots face in the 80s. He was subsequently chosen to act, alongside his schoolmate, Paul Ferry, for a role in  a new series 'Maggie'. 

He is also known for his appearances in television shows during the 1980s, including Taggart, Take The High Road and Play for Today. His last credited acting appearance was in an episode of Doctor Finlay (1994). He currently works as a role play actor for medical students.

External links 
 
 http://www.interactroleplay.co.uk/jo_mullaney.html

20th-century Scottish male actors
1962 births
Living people
Male actors from Glasgow
Scottish male film actors
Scottish male television actors